Robert Russel Reid (26 October 26 1927 – 21 January 2022) was a Canadian book artist, typographer, printer and graphic designer.

Reid began his fascination with printing as young boy, having received a toy printing press as a gift.  After graduating from University of British Columbia, he set up his own shop in downtown Vancouver.

From 1963 to 1976, worked at McGill University in Montreal as a designer and production manager at McGill University Press. During his tenure, Reid expanded the university's existing Redpath Press imprint to produce a number of ambitious books he felt no existing press in Canada was capable of undertaking. Two noteworthy works from Reid's iteration of Redpath Press were the Lawrence Lande Collection Canadiana (1965) and Portrait of a Period (1967).

Reid passed away in 2022.

References 

Canadian graphic designers
Canadian printers
Canadian typographers and type designers